The Women's team sprint event of the 2015 UCI Track Cycling World Championships was held on 18 February 2015.

Results

Qualifying
The qualifying was held at 20:00.

Finals
The finals were started at 21:15.

References

Women's team sprint
UCI Track Cycling World Championships – Women's team sprint